Reactome is a free online database of biological pathways. There are several Reactomes that concentrate on specific organisms, the largest of these is focused on human biology, the following description concentrates on the human Reactome. It is authored by biologists, in collaboration with Reactome editorial staff. The content is cross-referenced to many bioinformatics databases. The rationale behind Reactome is to visually represent biological pathways in full mechanistic detail, while making the source data available in a computationally accessible format. 
The website can be used to browse pathways and submit data to a suite of data analysis tools. The underlying data is fully downloadable in a number of standard formats including PDF, SBML and BioPAX. Pathway diagrams use a Systems Biology Graphical Notation (SBGN)-based style.

The core unit of the Reactome data model is the reaction. Entities (nucleic acids, proteins, complexes and small molecules) participating in reactions form a network of biological interactions and are grouped into pathways. Examples of biological pathways in Reactome include signaling, innate and acquired immune function, transcriptional regulation, translation, apoptosis and classical intermediary metabolism.

The pathways represented in Reactome are species-specific, with each pathway step supported by literature citations that contain an experimental verification of the process represented. If no experimental verification using human reagents exists, pathways may contain steps manually inferred from non-human experimental details, but only if an expert biologist, named as Author of the pathway, and a second biologist, names as reviewer, agree that this is a valid inference to make. The human pathways are used to computationally generate by an orthology-based process derived pathways in other organisms.

Database organization

In Reactome, human biological processes are annotated by breaking them down into series of molecular events. Like classical chemistry reactions each Reactome event has input physical entities (substrates) which interact, possibly facilitated by enzymes or other molecular catalysts, to generate output physical entities (products).

Reactions include the classical chemical interconversions of intermediary metabolism, binding events, complex formation, transport events that direct molecules between cellular compartments, and events such as the activation of a protein by cleavage of one or more of its peptide bonds. Individual events can be grouped together into pathways.

Physical entities can be small molecules like glucose or ATP, or large molecules like DNA, RNA, and proteins, encoded directly or indirectly in the human genome. Physical entities are cross-referenced to relevant external databases, such as UniProt for proteins and ChEBI for small molecules. Localization of molecules to subcellular compartments is a key feature of the regulation of human biological processes, so molecules in the Reactome database are associated with specific locations. Thus in Reactome instances of the same chemical entity in different locations (e.g., extracellular glucose and cytosolic glucose) are treated as distinct chemical entities.

The Gene Ontology controlled vocabularies are used to describe the subcellular locations of molecules and reactions, molecular functions, and the larger biological processes that a specific reaction is part of.

Database content

The database contains curated annotations that cover a diverse set of topics in molecular and cellular biology. Details of current and future annotation projects can be found in the calendar of annotation projects.

Topics of annotation include;
 cell cycle
 metabolism
 signaling
 transport
 cell motility
 immune function
 host-virus interaction
 neural function

Tools

There are tools on the website for viewing an interactive pathway diagram, performing pathway mapping and pathway over-representation analysis and for overlaying expression data onto Reactome pathways. The pathway mapping and over-representation tools take a single column of protein/compound identifiers, Uniprot and ChEBI accessions are preferred but the interface will accept and interpret many other identifiers or symbols. Mixed identifiers can be used.  Over-representation results are presented as a list of statistically over-represented pathways.

Expression data is submitted in a multi-column format, the first column identifying the protein, additional columns are expected to be numeric expression values, they can in fact be any numeric value, e.g. differential expression, quantitative proteomics, GWAS scores. The expression data is represented as colouring of the corresponding proteins in pathway diagrams, using the colours of the visible spectrum so 'hot' red colours represent high values. If multiple columns of numeric data are submitted the overlay tool can display them as separate 'experiments', e.g. timepoints or a disease progression.

The database can be browsed and searched as an on-line textbook. An on-line users' guide is available. Users can also download the current data set or individual pathways and reactions in a variety of formats including PDF, BioPAX, and SBML

Links to Reactome

 Reactome Quick Tour on EBI Train OnLine

See also
 KEGG (The Kyoto Encyclopedia of Genes and Genomes)
 BioCyc database collection
 BRENDA (The BRaunschweig ENzyme DAtabase)
 WikiPathways (which exposes Reactome pathways)
 Comparative Toxicogenomics Database

References

Related resources 
Other molecular pathway databases
 GeneNetwork
 Panther Pathways
 Pathway Commons

Biological databases